Livio is both a masculine Italian given name and a surname. Notable people with the name include:

Given name:
Livio Abramo (1903–1993), Brazilian artist
Livio Agresti (1508–1580), Italian painter
Livio Bendaña Espinoza (born 1935), Nicaraguan footballer and manager
Livio Berruti (born 1939), Italian sprinter
Livio Fongaro (1931–2007), Italian footballer and manager
Livio Francecchini (1902–?), Italian boxer
Livio Franceschini (1913–?), Italian basketball player
Livio Isotti (1927–1999), Italian cyclist
Livio Jean-Charles (born 1993), French basketball player
Livio Maitan (1923–2004), Italian Trotskyist
Livio Mehus (1630–1691), Flemish painter and engraver
Livio Melina (born 1952), Italian Roman Catholic theologian
Livio Minelli (1926–2012), Italian boxer
Livio Lorenzon (1923–1971), Italian actor
Livio Nabab (born 1988), French footballer
Livio Pavanelli (1881–1958), Italian actor
Livio Pin (born 1953), Italian footballer
Livio Dante Porta (1922–2003), Argentine engineer
Livio Prieto (born 1981), Argentine footballer
Livio Catullo Stecchini (1913–1979), American historian
Livio Trapè (born 1937), Italian cyclist
Livio Vacchini (1933–2007), Swiss architect

Surname:
Mario Livio (born 1945), Israeli astrophysicist and writer

Italian masculine given names